Dexter Colboyd Dunphy , (born 1934) is an Australian academic.

Education
Williams obtained a Dip Ed, and BA and M Ed degrees at the University of Sydney and a PhD in sociology at Harvard University.

Career
Dunphy joined the faculty of the University of New South Wales.
Dunphy later joined the faculty of University of Technology Sydney.

In 1972, Dunphy delivered the annual series of Australian Broadcasting Corporation Boyer Lectures on "The Challenge of Change".

Honours and awards
Dunphy was appointed a Member of the Order of Australia in 2007 for "service to education, particularly in the fields of organisational change, corporate sustainability and business management, and to the community". He was elected a Fellow of the Academy of the Social Sciences in Australia in 2001.

References

1934 births
Living people
Members of the Order of Australia
University of Sydney alumni
Harvard Graduate School of Arts and Sciences alumni
Academic staff of the University of New South Wales
Academic staff of the University of Technology Sydney
Fellows of the Academy of the Social Sciences in Australia